William Webster Diehl (January 15, 1891 – 1978) was an American mycologist recognized for his work on grass pathogens, particularly in the genus Balansia.

Diehl was born in on January 15, 1891 in Logansport, Indiana  to parents Edwin Randall Diehl and Mary Delilah Wyrick Diehl. The family moved to Ohio shortly after his birth and he attended grammar school in Dayton. He attended Miami University from 1910–1914 and received an MSc in botany from Iowa State College in 1915. He was briefly an instructor of botany and plant pathology with Clemson before joining the USDA where he worked from 1928 until his retirement in 1958.

He was honoured in 1954, when Diehliomyces is a genus of fungi in the Ascomycota phylum, was named after him.

See also
List of mycologists

References

External links
 

1891 births
1978 deaths
American mycologists
Iowa State University alumni
Miami University alumni